Francisco Núñez may refer to:
 Francisco Núñez (conductor), American conductor and composer
 Francisco Núñez (boxer), Argentine boxer
 Francisco Núñez (politician), Spanish politician
 Francisco Núñez Melián, Spanish adventurer and royal administrator